Air Marshal Vinod Patney, SYSM, PVSM, AVSM, VrC is a retired Indian Air Force officer. He is currently Director General Centre for Air Power Studies.

Career
Patney was commissioned in Indian Air Force in 1961. He has participated in conflict of 1965 for which he was awarded a Vir Chakra. He also participated in the 1971 India-Pakistan war.

He is former Director General of HelpAge India.

Vir Chakra citation
Air Marshal Patney was awarded the Vir Chakra for operations during the 1965 India Pakistan War. His Vir Chakra Citation reads as follows:

Awards and decorations
Patney was awarded the SYSM, PVSM, AVSM and VrC in his career with the Indian Air Force that lasted more than four decades.

References 

Indian Air Force air marshals
Indian Air Force officers
Indian aviators
Recipients of the Vir Chakra
Recipients of the Param Vishisht Seva Medal
Living people
Year of birth missing (living people)
Vice Chiefs of Air Staff (India)
Rashtriya Indian Military College alumni